The year 713 BC was the first year of the pre-Julian Roman calendar. At the time, it was known as year 41 Ab urbe condita (or, less frequently 41 AUC). The denomination 713 BC for this year has been used since early medieval period, when the Anno Domini calendar era became the prevalent method in Europe for naming years.

Events
 Numa Pompilius reforms the Roman calendar.

Births

Deaths

References

710s BC